Tesfaye Eticha (born June 27, 1974) is a male long-distance runner from Switzerland (formerly Ethiopia), who won the 1994 edition of Amsterdam Marathon, clocking 2:15:56 on September 25, 1994. He mainly competed in Switzerland during his career. Eticha is a seven-time winner of the Lausanne Marathon.

Achievements

External links

marathoninfo

1974 births
Living people
Ethiopian male long-distance runners
Place of birth missing (living people)
Ethiopian male marathon runners
Ethiopian expatriate sportspeople in Switzerland
Sportspeople from Oromia Region